The Arish hotel bombing was a terrorist attack on a hotel in the coastal city of Al-Arish, Egypt, on 24 November 2015. A group of militants approached the heavily guarded hotel with a car bomb, but Egyptian security forces opened fire at the vehicle, blowing it up before it could reach the building. One of the two attackers managed to get inside the hotel, where a number of people were injured and killed as a result of gunfire and a subsequent suicide bombing. Authorities reported at least seven dead, including two judges who had been in Al-Arish to supervise the country's second round of parliamentary elections, held the day before. The Islamic State's Wilayat Sinai offshoot claimed responsibility in a statement released later the same day.

Attack

The attack began at around 7 a.m. when a vehicle driven by a suicide bomber approached the area of the Swiss Inn Resort in Al-Arish. The car exploded after security forces opened fire, but another militant managed to gain entry into the building, shooting several people and detonating his suicide belt near the kitchen area. The hotel had been housing judges responsible for overseeing the second round of parliamentary elections, which was held the day before the assault.

Responsibility
The Islamic State's Wilayat Sinai branch claimed responsibility for the attack in a statement posted on social media. The group said it was in response to the Egyptian government's imprisonment of women, but it did not provide further details.

Impact

See also 
 Sinai insurgency
 Operation Martyr's Right
 July 2015 Sinai clashes

References

Mass murder in 2015
Mass murder in Egypt
Terrorist incidents in Egypt in 2015
Terrorist incidents in the Sinai Peninsula
ISIL terrorist incidents in Egypt
Suicide bombings in Egypt
Sinai insurgency
Attacks on hotels in Asia
Hotel bombings